Dennis Wolfberg (March 29, 1946 – October 3, 1994) was an American stand-up comedian and actor.

Early life
Born on March 29, 1946 on Long Island to Frances and Sidney Wolfberg, Wolfberg was a school teacher before launching a full-time comedy career in 1979. Wolfberg attended Queens College, where he received a master's degree in clinical psychology.

Family
Wolfberg married fellow comedian Jeannie McBride on September 8, 1985; the couple had three sons, Daniel and twins Matthew and David.

Comedy career
Wolfberg began his comedy career in New York City at the Comic Strip.  Although he always wanted to be a comedian, he auditioned as a singer, playing his Martin guitar.  Fortuitously, his audition piece was the Comic Strip's owner's favorite song: "American Pie."  Wolfberg appeared twice on The Tonight Show.  In addition, he was a frequent guest on The Merv Griffin Show, The Pat Sajak Show, and The Arsenio Hall Show.  He starred in his own half-hour comedy special on HBO in 1990. He also had a recurring role as Gooshie on NBC's Quantum Leap, and in April 1993, Entertainment Tonight aired "A Day in the Life of Dennis Wolfberg," focusing on his relentless touring schedule.

He headlined at comedy clubs across the country as well as working in Las Vegas and Atlantic City on a regular basis.  He was twice named America's top male comic in votes by clubgoers and owners nationwide. In 1990, he won an American Comedy Award as best male stand-up.

Death
Wolfberg died of melanoma on October 3, 1994, aged 48. He had been diagnosed with cancer at least two years before his death, and he continued to work through the end of August 1994. At the time of his death, he was negotiating a deal for his own TV show.

Filmography and TV appearances
 1982 - The Clairvoyant 
 1986 - Late Night with David Letterman - guest
 1984, 1987 - The Tonight Show Starring Johnny Carson - guest, 2 episodes
 1989–1993 - Quantum Leap - 5 episodes
 1990 - Teacher Teacher (TV short), Plot Outline: Wolfberg relived some of his finest moments as a teacher, and proves that in a tough classroom, a good sense of humor is the most essential weapon.
 1991 - To Tell the Truth - panelist - 5 consecutive episodes
 2002 - Best of the Improv Volume 4
 2007 - Comedy Club Greats

References

External links

 
 
Gooshie's Legacy: A Tribute to Dennis Wolfberg of Quantum Leap

1946 births
1994 deaths
Male actors from New York (state)
American male comedians
People from Long Island
Deaths from melanoma
Deaths from cancer in California
Queens College, City University of New York alumni
20th-century American male actors
Comedians from New York (state)
20th-century American comedians
Burials at Hillside Memorial Park Cemetery
Jewish American male comedians
20th-century American Jews